The 2017–18 South Carolina Gamecocks men's basketball team represented the University of South Carolina during the 2017–18 NCAA Division I men's basketball season. The team's head coach, Frank Martin, was in his sixth season at South Carolina. The team played its home games at Colonial Life Arena in Columbia, South Carolina as a member of the Southeastern Conference. They finished the season 17–16, 7–11 in SEC play to finish in a tie for 11th place. They defeated Ole Miss in the first round of the SEC tournament before losing in the second round to Arkansas.

Previous season
The Gamecocks finished the 2016–17 season 26–11, 12–6 in SEC play to finish in a tie for third place. They lost in the quarterfinals of the SEC tournament to Alabama. They received an at-large bid to the NCAA tournament as a No. 7 seed in the East region. In the First Round, they defeated No. 10-seeded Marquette, the school's first NCAA Tournament win since 1974. They then defeated No. 2-seeded Duke to earn a trip to the Sweet Sixteen. In the Sweet Sixteen, they blew out No. 3 seed and No. 12-ranked Baylor by 20 points to earn a trip the Elite Eight. In the Elite Eight, they defeated fellow SEC-member No. 4-seeded Florida to advance to the first Final Four in school history. There the Gamecocks lost to the West Region's No. 1 seed, Gonzaga. The 26 wins marked the most wins in school history.

Offseason

Departures

Incoming transfers

2017 recruiting class

2018 recruiting class

Roster

Schedule and results

|-
!colspan=12 style=|Exhibition

|-
!colspan=12 style=| Regular season

|-
!colspan=9 style= | SEC tournament

See also
2017–18 South Carolina Gamecocks women's basketball team

References

South Carolina Gamecocks men's basketball seasons
Gamecocks
South Carolina
Gamecocks